Air Arabia Jordan was a low-cost carrier based in Jordan. The airline was a joint venture between the RUM Group in Jordan and Air Arabia and was the first low-cost airline based in Jordan.

History

In January 2015 Air Arabia announced the acquisition of a 49% stake in Jordanian operator Petra Airlines. The principal shareholder of Petra Airlines, the RUM Group, retain a 51% stake in the airline, which was rebranded as Air Arabia Jordan in early 2015. It operates 2 Airbus A320 aircraft and there are plans to develop a new hub in Amman.

Air Arabia Jordan ended scheduled service in November 2017 and moved to charter operations. and the airline ceased operations completely in April 2018.

Destinations
Egypt
Sharm el-Sheikh - Sharm el-Sheikh International Airport
Georgia
Tbilisi - Tbilisi International Airport

Jordan
Amman - Queen Alia International Airport Hub
Kuwait
 Kuwait International Airport
Saudi Arabia
Dammam - King Fahd International Airport
Jeddah - King Abdulaziz International Airport
Riyadh - King Khalid International Airport
Turkey
Istanbul - Sabiha Gökçen International Airport

Fleet
The Air Arabia Jordan fleet consisted of the following aircraft (as of August 2017):

References

External links
Official website
About Air Arabia Jordan

Defunct airlines of Jordan
Airlines established in 2014
Airlines disestablished in 2018
2018 disestablishments in Jordan
Jordanian companies established in 2014
Defunct low-cost airlines

ar:العربية للطيران مصر
es:Air Arabia Jordan